Kodam IX/Udayana (IX Military Regional Command/Udayana) is a military area command of the Indonesian Army which is responsible for the Lesser Sunda Islands. It was established as part of the 1985 reorganisation of the Indonesian National Armed Forces (TNI) and included East Timor until that province achieved independence in 1999.

History
Between 1969 and 1985, Kodam XVI Udayana was responsible for Bali, East Nusa Tenggara and West Nusa Tenggara while Kodam IX administered units in East Kalimantan. As part of a broad reorganisation of the TNI in 1985, the number of Kodem was reduced from sixteen to ten, with all of the Indonesian portion of Borneo (Kalimantan) coming under Kodam VI/Tanjungpura and Kodam XVI, which by this time included East Timor, being redesignated Kodam IX.

In 1997, combat units included five infantry battalions, a cavalry troop in East Timor, and an engineer battalion. District commands included Korem 161 (HQ Kupang), Korem 162 (HQ Mataram), Korem 163 (HQ Denpasar), and Korem 164 (HQ Dili). SOF magazine reported forces in East Timor in September 1997 as ten battalions; eight rotationary, two permanent (744th and 745th Battalions), special 'ranger-style' companies, and Detachment 81 of Kopassus.

East Timor continued to fall within Kodam IX's area of responsibility in 1999, with the military units in the province itself coming under the sub-regional command Korem 164/Wiradharma. In July of that year Kodam IX developed plans for Operation Pull-Out ('Operasi Cabut') which was to be executed alongside a plan developed by the TNI Headquarters ('Contingency Plan 1999-2000') if the East Timorese voted for independence in the East Timor popular consultation. After this eventuated, these plans were executed in September and involved the rapid evacuation of 70,000 Indonesian administrators and soldiers and 180,000 East Timorese, which contributed to the 1999 East Timorese crisis. The plans do not prove that the TNI planned the post-referendum violence, however.

After East Timor achieved independence, Kodam IX retained responsibility for Bali, East Nusa Tenggara and West Nusa Tenggara. In 2002 the Border Security Task Force, monitoring the border with East Timor, was reported to include a headquarters drawn from the 3rd Airborne Infantry Brigade (:id:Brigade infanteri lintas udara 3), 321 Battalion (Kostrad) in the northern border sector, 721 Battalion in the southern sector, and a detachment from 407 Battalion around Oecussi.

Battalions include Battalion 744. In 2009–2010 a new infantry brigade was formed in West Timor, the 21st Brigade (:id:Brigade infanteri 21). Its task appears to be control of the border between West Timor and East Timor. Relations with the East Timor Police Service on the border are cordial and informal, but appear to lack formalised discussion mechanisms for any border incidents that might arise.

Territorial Command
 Korem 161/Wira Sakti
 Kodim 1601/East Sumba Regency
 Kodim 1602/Ende Regency
 Kodim 1603/Sikka Regency
 Kodim 1604/Kupang City
 Kodim 1605/Belu Regency
 Kodim 1612/Manggarai Regency
 Kodim 1613/West Sumba Regency
 Kodim 1618/North Central Timor Regency
 Kodim 1621/South Central Timor Regency
 Kodim 1622/Alor Regency
 Kodim 1624/East Flores Regency
 Kodim 1625/Ngada Regency
 Kodim 1627/Rote Ndao Regency
 Kodim 1629/Southwest Sumba Regency
 Korem 162/Wira Bhakti
 Kodim 1606/West Lombok Regency
 Kodim 1607/Sumbawa Regency
 Kodim 1608/Bima Regency
 Kodim 1614/Dompu Regency
 Kodim 1615/East Lombok Regency
 Kodim 1620/Central Lombok Regency
 Kodin 1628/West Sumbawa Regency
 742nd Special Raider Infantry Battalion/Satya Wira Yudha
 Korem 163/Wira Satya
 Kodim 1609/Buleleng
 Kodim 1610/Klungkung
 Kodim 1611/Badung
 Kodim 1616/Gianyar
 Kodim 1617/Jembrana
 Kodim 1619/Tabanan
 Kodim 1623/Karangasem
 Kodim 1626/Bangli

Combat Units & Support Combat Units 
 21st Infantry Brigade/Komodo
 Brigade HQ
 743rd Infantry Battalion/Pradnya Samapta Yudha
 744th Infantry Battalion/Satya Yudha Bhakti
 746th Infantry Battalion/Nitya Yudha Bhakti
 900th Raider Infantry Battalion/Satya Bhakti Wirottama
 741st Mechanized Infantry Battalion/Garuda Nusantara
 18th Combat Engineering Battalion/Yudha Karya Raksaka
 4th Cavalry Detachment/Shima Pasupati
 9th Cavalry Troop/Komodo Ksatria Anuraga

Training units 
The Training Units in Kodam IX/Udayana are organised under the Kodam IX/Udayana Training Regiment/Resimen Induk Kodam IX/Udayana (Rindam IX/Udayana). The units are:
 Regiment HQ
 Satuan Dodik Latpur (Combat Training Command Unit)
 Satuan Dodik Kejuruan (Specialist Training Command Unit)
 Sekolah Calon Bintara (Non-Commissioned Officer Training School)
 Sekolah Calon Tamtama (Enlisted  Training School)
 Sekolah Dodik Bela Negara (National Defence Training Command Unit)

Support units 
The other support units are:
 Military Police Command (Pomdam IX/Udayana)
 Public Relations (Pendam IX/Udayana)
 Adjutant's General Corps (Ajendam IX/Udayana)
 Medical Department (Kesdam IX/Udayana)
 Military Physical (Jasdam IX/Udayana)
 Veterans and National Reserves Administration (Babiminvetcadam IX/Udayana)
 Topography Service (Topdam IX/Udayana)
 Chaplaincy Corps (Bintaldam IX/Udayana)
 Finance Office (Kudam IX/Udayana)
 Legal Affairs (Kumdam IX/Udayana)
 Service Detachment (Denmadam IX/Udayana)
 Information and Data Center (Infolahtadam IX/Udayana)
 Supply (Bekangdam IX/Udayana)
 Transport Corps (Hubdam IX/Udayana)
 Ordnance Department (Paldam IX/Udayana)
 Engineers Command (Zidam IX/Udayana)
 Signals Corps (Sandidam IX/Udayana)
 Intelligence Command (Inteldam IX/Udayana)

See also 
Indonesian Army

References
Notes

Bibliography

External links

Military of Indonesia
Military units and formations of Indonesia
09
East Nusa Tenggara
West Nusa Tenggara
Military units and formations established in 1957
Indonesian Army